The Free Press is an American, English language daily newspaper published in Mankato, Minnesota.

History

On April 4, 1887, Editor L.P. Hunt published the first issue of the Mankato Daily Free Press and found it was not easy. In an apology to his readers, Hunt wrote "The labor incident to getting out the initial number of a daily paper is vastly more trying than people not familiar with newspaper work and worry are aware of or can be devised of. The fact, therefore, that today's Daily Free Press is decidedly short on telegraphic, as well as some other matter, is no exception to the perplexities experienced by newspaper men and we feel sure the public will bear with us a day or two until the 'mercheen' is fairly oiled and put in good running order."
Since that time, the 'mercheen' hasn't skipped a beat publishing more than 100 years serving the Mankato region.

The seminal publication actually was the Independent which began in 1857. Six years later, it was bought by Charles Slocum and named the Mankato Union. Then in 1880 the Union and its rival Mankato paper, the Record, merged and became the Mankato Weekly Free Press. It ran as a weekly until 1887, when it became a daily. It began as a conservative Republican newspaper remaining that way until modern days. The word "Daily" was dropped from its name in 1940 and 30 years later, "Mankato" was dropped.

The last local owner of the paper was Jared How, who sold The Free Press Co. to Ottaway Newspapers Inc., a wholly owned subsidiary of Dow Jones & Company. Ottaway acquired 11 percent of the company in 1977 and the remainder in 1979. In 2002, Ottaway sold The Free Press and other papers to Community Newspaper Holdings Inc.
On its 50th anniversary, The Free Press circulation was 12,000.  In 2019, the circulation was Sunday:  17762/Monday-Saturday: 14209.   It  also publishes the Mankato Magazine, "MN Valley Business" magazine and The Land a Minnesota farm and rural life publication. It also serves its readers through www.mankatofreepress.com which started in 1994 and now ranks as the No. 1 news website in the region. It was named the 2010 CNHI Newspaper of the Year.

Content
The Free Press news staff covers six counties -- Blue Earth, Nicollet, Le Sueur, Brown, Waseca and Watonwan. The major cities of Mankato, North Mankato, Waseca, St. Peter and Le Sueur are also primary coverage areas.  It also has wide coverage of local sports and Minnesota State University in Mankato. It also is the publisher of Mankato Magazine (circulation 10,000), the MN Valley Business magazine and The Land (circulation 35,000).

See also
 List of newspapers in Minnesota

References

Newspapers published in Minnesota
Mankato, Minnesota
Publications established in 1887
1887 establishments in Minnesota